Filip Pjević (born 29 May 1991) is a Serbian football defender.

References

External links
 
 Filip Pjević stats at utakmica.rs 
 

1991 births
Living people
Footballers from Belgrade
Association football defenders
Serbian footballers
OFK Beograd players
FK Mladost Apatin players
OFK Mladenovac players
FK Teleoptik players
FK Jedinstvo Užice players
Serbian SuperLiga players